Pseudospirobolellidae, is a family of Round-backed millipedes of the order Spirobolida. The family includes 12 species belonging to seven genera.

Genera
 
Azygobolus
Benoitolus
Guamobolus
Javolus
Pseudospirobolellus
Saipanellas
Solaenobolellus

References

Spirobolida
Millipede families